Gabriel Tucker Steward (c.1768-1836) was a Tory politician, Member of the Great Britain and UK Parliaments for Weymouth and Melcombe Regis and served as Governor of Portland Castle.

References 

1768 births
1836 deaths
Tory members of the Parliament of Great Britain
Tory members of the Parliament of the United Kingdom
UK MPs 1801–1802
UK MPs 1802–1806
UK MPs 1806–1807
UK MPs 1906–1910